Mount Victoria is a prominent hill  high immediately to the east of central Wellington, New Zealand. About 4 kilometres due south is a spur named Mount Albert and the two are linked by a ridge. Mount Victoria's residential area is on its north-western slopes.

History

Mount Victoria's original Māori name is Tangi Te Keo, though Matairangi is also used. The first name derives from a legend in which two taniwha tried to escape from Wellington Harbour which was then an enclosed lake. One taniwha became stranded and died, and its spirit turned into a bird named Te Keo, which flew to the top of the mountain and mourned (tangi). The second name translates as "to examine the sky".

It was settled as, at its foot, Wellington's Te Aro filled with commercial activities. Residents needed to be close to the city but wanted more comfortable surroundings. For a long time, it was one of Wellington's sources of fresh milk from its dairy farms.

Demographics 

Mount Victoria had a population of 4,527 at the 2018 New Zealand census, an increase of 129 people (2.9%) since the 2013 census, and an increase of 189 people (4.4%) since the 2006 census. There were 1,785 households. There were 2,199 males and 2,328 females, giving a sex ratio of 0.94 males per female. The median age was 30.9 years (compared with 37.4 years nationally), with 351 people (7.8%) aged under 15 years, 1,800 (39.8%) aged 15 to 29, 2,007 (44.3%) aged 30 to 64, and 366 (8.1%) aged 65 or older.

Ethnicities were 82.0% European/Pākehā, 7.2% Māori, 2.4% Pacific peoples, 13.4% Asian, and 4.9% other ethnicities (totals add to more than 100% since people could identify with multiple ethnicities).

The proportion of people born overseas was 34.9%, compared with 27.1% nationally.

Although some people objected to giving their religion, 63.5% had no religion, 23.2% were Christian, 2.1% were Hindu, 0.5% were Muslim, 1.4% were Buddhist and 4.0% had other religions.

Of those at least 15 years old, 2,286 (54.7%) people had a bachelor or higher degree, and 156 (3.7%) people had no formal qualifications. The median income was $46,700, compared with $31,800 nationally. The employment status of those at least 15 was that 2,754 (65.9%) people were employed full-time, 588 (14.1%) were part-time, and 174 (4.2%) were unemployed.

Features

Town belt

Greek community

A strong link was forged between Cretans and New Zealanders during World War II. New Zealanders left behind in the retreat from Crete were hidden from the occupying army by Cretans at great personal danger and they were able to harass occupying forces.  A commemoration of the Battle of Crete is held each year in May.
Lloyd Street which is the site of the Greek community centre and the Greek Orthodox Cathedral was renamed Hania Street after Crete's old capital. Wellington's Olympic Football Club was established by Father Ilias Economou for his parishioners.

About 65 per cent of Greek New Zealanders live in Wellington and in the decades following World War II they were concentrated in Mount Victoria. The greatest concentration is now in Miramar and around half of Greek weddings are now with other New Zealanders.

Boundaries

The suburb is almost entirely residential with commercial activity along Kent Terrace on its north-western boundary. The houses are on the north-western flank of the ridge above the southern end of the Wellington CBD, Te Aro. Adjoining suburbs are Oriental Bay with Roseneath, Newtown to the south, Te Aro to the west beyond Kent Terrace and Hataitai on the far side of the ridge beyond the town belt.
Waterfront
What would seem to be residential Mount Victoria's frontage to the harbour is now technically a one-building-wide strip of Oriental Bay. The houses in Roxburgh, McFarlane, Hawker and Moeller Streets are all in Mount Victoria. The houses below those streets front onto Oriental Parade which is defined as Oriental Bay. The old monastery is in Mount Victoria. Palliser Road is in Roseneath.

Wellington College and Government House, official residence of New Zealand's Governor-General, are beyond the southern boundary to the south-east of cricket's Basin Reserve. Beyond Government House is Newtown's Wellington Hospital.
Houses

Lord of the Rings connection

Mount Victoria was used twice as a location in Peter Jackson's The Lord of the Rings film trilogy. The very first footage on the project was shot off Alexandra Road on 11 October 1999, called the "Get off the road" scene, followed by the "Escape from the Nazgûl" scenes a few hundred metres to the North. Later an old quarry at the top end of Ellice Street was used as the Rohirrim camp at Dunharrow.

Education

Primary schools

Secondary schools

Wellington College is a boys' state secondary school for Year 9 to 13 students, founded in 1867.

Wellington East Girls' College is a girls' state secondary school for Year 9 to 13 students, founded in 1925.

References

External links

Full Moon Silhouettes The Mount Victoria Lookout during moonrise
Mt Victoria Community Groups Websites
Mt Victoria Historical Society

Suburbs of Wellington City
Greek-New Zealand culture
Victoria